Airport Interchange may refer to:

Newark Airport Interchange, near Newark Liberty International Airport in New Jersey
Dolphin–Palmetto Interchange, near Miami International Airport, Miami-Dade County, Florida